Bracewell and Brogden is a civil parish in Pendle, Lancashire, England. It contains eleven listed buildings that are recorded in the National Heritage List for England.  Of these, one is listed at Grade I, the highest of the three grades, and the others are at Grade II, the lowest grade.  The parish is almost completely rural, and most of the listed buildings are farmhouses and farm buildings.  The remaining listed buildings are other houses and a church.

Key

Buildings

Notes and references

Notes

Citations

Sources

Lists of listed buildings in Lancashire
Buildings and structures in the Borough of Pendle